Haji (born Barbarella Catton; January 24, 1946 – August 9, 2013) was a Canadian-born actress of British and Filipino descent, and a former exotic dancer known for her role in Russ Meyer's 1965 cult classic Faster, Pussycat! Kill! Kill!. She made significant contributions to her roles by introducing elements of psychedelia and witchcraft as well as writing most of her own dialogue.

Life and career
Born in Quebec, Canada, Haji—a nickname given to her by an uncle—appeared in several Russ Meyer films, including Motorpsycho (1965), Faster, Pussycat! Kill! Kill! (1965), Good Morning and... Goodbye! (1967), and Supervixens (1975).  Haji's final role was as Moonji in Killer Drag Queens on Dope (2003).

Haji was reunited with fellow Russ Meyer film stars Kitten Natividad and Raven De La Croix in the 2001 comedy feature film The Double-D Avenger, directed by William Winckler. In it, Haji played evil exotic dancer Hydra Heffer.

Haji was featured as one of the top 1,000 most glamorous women of the 20th century in the book Glamorous Girls of the Century by Steve Sullivan.  She was also interviewed in the book Invasion of the B-Girls by Jewel Shepard.  Haji lived in Malibu, California.

Haji died in Oxnard, California, at the age of 67.  Never married, she had a daughter, Cerlette Lammé.

Selected filmography
 Motorpsycho (1965)
 Faster, Pussycat! Kill! Kill! (1965)
 Good Morning and... Goodbye! (1967)
 Supervixens (1975)

References

External links
 
 
 Haji gravesite at Santa Barbara Cemetery

Actresses from Quebec
Canadian expatriate actresses in the United States
Canadian film actresses
1946 births
2013 deaths
20th-century Canadian actresses
Burials at Santa Barbara Cemetery
Deaths from stomach cancer
Deaths from lung cancer in California
Canadian actresses of Filipino descent
Canadian people of British descent